Robert Talbot (died 1558) was a scholar and scribe of Anglo-Saxon. Marginalia in his hand are found in the F manuscript of the Anglo-Saxon Chronicle, British Library Cotton MS Domitian A VIII.

References

1558 deaths
Anglo-Saxon studies scholars
Year of birth unknown